Larga (Cyrillic: Ларга) is a railway station of the Lviv Railways.

It is administered by the Ivano-Frankivsk administration. The station is located on the border with Moldova and has three directions towards Chernivtsi, Sokiryany and Khmelnytskyi Oblast as part of the Southwestern Railways.

External links
 Larga railway station at railwayz.info

Lviv Railways stations
Railway stations in Chernivtsi Oblast